Dame Heather Jane Williams  (born 1963) is a British High Court judge. 

Williams was born in Portsmouth, England and attended King's College London, graduating with a first-class LLB degree in 1984. 

She was called to the bar at Gray's Inn in 1985 and was in practice from 1987, specialising in civil liberties, judicial review and employment discrimination; she practised from and was deputy head of chambers of Doughty Street Chambers. She appeared before the inquests into the Hillsborough disaster and was successful in Miriam O'Reilly's age discrimination case against the BBC. Williams took silk in 2006, was a part-time judge for the Employment Tribunals from 2005 until 2018, and served as a recorder and a deputy High Court judge from 2018. 

On 1 October 2021, Williams was appointed a judge of the High Court and assigned to the Queen's Bench Division. She received the customary damehood in the same year. 

In 1997, she married Trevor Bragg and together they have a son and a daughter.

References 

1963 births
Living people
Alumni of King's College London
British women judges
Dames Commander of the Order of the British Empire
21st-century King's Counsel
English King's Counsel
21st-century English judges
People from Portsmouth
Members of Gray's Inn
Queen's Bench Division judges